A paycheck is a paper document issued by an employer to pay an employee for services rendered.

Paycheck may also refer to:
 "Paycheck" (short story), a 1953 short story by Philip K. Dick
 Paycheck (film), a 2003 film adaptation of the Philip K. Dick short story
 Paycheck (collection), a 2004 collection of stories by Philip K. Dick
 Beyond Lies the Wub (collection) or Paycheck and Other Classic Stories,  a 1988 collection of stories by Philip K. Dick

People with the surname
 Johnny Paycheck (1938–2003), American country music singer

See also
Paychex, a payroll outsourcing company